NGC 1664 is an open cluster in the constellation of Auriga.

NGC 1664 is a somewhat young cluster, with an age of 675 ± 50 Myr, and is dynamically relaxed. It is located some 4,200 light-years away, or about 1.3 kpc. Born outside of the solar circle, it orbits the center of the Milky Way every 244 million years.

References

External links
 
 NGC 1664
 NGC 1664
 Image NGC 1664
 

NGC 1664
1664
Auriga (constellation)